Mount Baldr is a mountain on Baffin Island, located  northeast of Pangnirtung, Nunavut, Canada. It lies in the southern Baffin Mountains, which in turn form part of the Arctic Cordillera mountain system. Like nearby Breidablik Peak and Mount Odin and other peaks in the Arctic Cordillera, its name comes from Norse mythology. It is named after Baldr, a god in Germanic paganism and is Odin's second son.

References

Arctic Cordillera
One-thousanders of Nunavut